Susan Joan Holderness (born 28 May 1949) is an English actress on both stage and screen having had appearances in Bless This House (1974), The New Avengers (1977), Canned Laughter (1979), The Sandbaggers (1980), The Cleopatras and It Takes a Worried Man (1983), The Brief and Minder (1984), Doctors (2004-2014), Still Open All Hours (2018–2019) EastEnders and The Madame Blanc Mysteries (2021). However, she is best known for her role as Marlene Boyce in Only Fools and Horses from 1985 to 2003, and its spin-off The Green Green Grass from 2005 to 2009.

Career
Holderness was born on 28 May 1949, in Hampstead, London. After taking her A-levels, she trained at the Central School of Speech and Drama.

She began her acting career with the Manchester 69 Theatre Company in A Midsummer Night’s Dream, Peer Gynt and as Desdemona in Catch My Soul (Jack Good's rock-musical version of Othello). She has worked consistently in theatre, radio, film and television. West End plays include The Female Odd Couple, Why Not Stay for Breakfast, The Male of the Species and the highly acclaimed one-woman play Our Kid (based on Myra Hindley).

Holderness regularly appeared in The Vagina Monologues and she was in the cast of the touring play Seven Deadly Sins Four Deadly Sinners. She has toured the country in numerous plays and worked in several repertory companies. Much of her career has been spent doing Alan Ayckbourn plays, three of which (Relatively Speaking, Time and Time Again, and How the Other Half Loves)  she toured with John Challis, who played Boycie to her long-suffering Marlene in Only Fools And Horses.  She played a main role in the Only fools and horses Spin-off series The Green, Green Grass, which ran from 2005 – 2009,  including four series and three Christmas Specials.

Holderness played the role of Annie in the 2010 & 2011 UK Tours of Calendar Girls. She played Celia in the 2012 tour (Jan – May) and went back to playing Annie in the Autumn 2012 tour (Sep – December).

Television roles include Marianne in The Sandbaggers (two series), Bless This House, as Pamela Huntley-Johnson in the episode The Bells Are Ringing (1974), as Liz in It Takes a Worried Man (two series), Jo in The Brief, Cleopatra IV in The Cleopatras; as Laura Doolan, a wife of serial bigamist "Confident" Clive Cosgrove in the  Minder episode  A Number of Old Wives Tales (1984); episodes of  The New Avengers, Thriller, Sob Sisters, Growing Pains, Doctors, Lime Street with Robert Wagner, and Murder in Suburbia. She played Rowan Atkinson's love interest, Lorraine, in Canned Laughter, and did numerous impersonations in two series of End of Part One. She played Maggie in Dear John, by John Sullivan, Joan Forrester (Oscar Blaketon's former wife) in Heartbeat for YTV, Joan Travis in Revelations, and Rachel's mother in Cold Feet,  also for Granada. In April 2021, she made a guest appearance in the BBC soap opera EastEnders as Estelle.

Films include That'll Be the Day (1973) and It Could Happen to You (aka Intimate Teenage Secrets) (1976). She also appeared in the low budget feature Meat Draw and Out of Sight for Granada. 

Holderness regularly appears in pantomime. including All you need for Christmas at Fareham, Hampshire in 2009.

In 2014, Holderness appeared in the BBC One medical drama Casualty as Alice Sweeney.  In 2018 onwards, Holderness has appeared as Mrs Rossi in the sitcom Still Open All Hours.

Personal life
Holderness is married to Mark Piper, former executive director of the Theatre Royal, Windsor. Her adult children are Harriet, a yoga instructor, and Freddie, head of history at a school in West Sussex. She has one grandchild (2018), Max. Sue is a strong supporter and ambassador for Thames Hospice.

Filmography

Film

Television

References

External links
 
 Intertalent profile

1949 births
Living people
20th-century English actresses
21st-century English actresses
Actresses from London
Alumni of the Royal Central School of Speech and Drama
British comedy actresses
English stage actresses
English television actresses
People from Hampstead